The Low Desert is a common name for any desert in California that is under 2,000 feet (609.6 m) in altitude. These areas include, but are not exclusive to, the Colorado Desert and Yuha Desert, in the Southern California portion of the Sonoran Desert. These areas are distinguished in biogeography from the adjacent northern High Desert or Mojave Desert by latitude, elevation, animal life, climate, and native plant communities.

Communities

The cities and towns in the Low Desert include:

Coachella Valley area
Bermuda Dunes
Cathedral City
Coachella
Desert Hot Springs
Indian Wells
Indio
La Quinta
Mecca
Palm Desert
Palm Springs
Rancho Mirage
Thermal
Thousand Palms
Imperial Valley area
Brawley
Calexico
El Centro
Lower Colorado River Valley area
Blythe
Palo Verde
Winterhaven
Borrego Springs

Parks
Anza-Borrego Desert State Park
Joshua Tree National Park – northern portion of Low Desert
Salton Sea State Recreation Area
Indio Hills Palms Park
Santa Rosa and San Jacinto Mountains National Monument
Big Morongo Canyon Preserve

Wildlife refuges and wilderness areas

Coachella Valley National Wildlife Refuge
Imperial National Wildlife Refuge
Havasu National Wildlife Refuge
Cibola National Wildlife Refuge
Sonny Bono Salton Sea National Wildlife Refuge
Fish Creek Mountains Wilderness
Santa Rosa Wilderness
Indian Pass Wilderness
Whipple Mountains Wilderness
Sawtooth Mountains Wilderness
Little Picacho Wilderness

See also
:Category:Populated places in the Colorado Desert
:Category:Protected areas of the Colorado Desert
:Category:Wilderness areas within the Lower Colorado River Valley
:Category:Flora of the California desert regions
:Category:Mountain ranges of the Colorado Desert

References

Deserts of California
 •
Regions of California
Deserts of the Lower Colorado River Valley
.
.
.
.
Geography of Southern California
Inland Empire
Desert
Coachella Valley
Imperial Valley
Blythe, California
Indio, California
Palm Springs, California